The 2012–13 Liga Profesional de Primera División season, also known as the 2012–13 Copa Uruguaya or the 2012–13 Campeonato Uruguayo, was the 109th season of Uruguay's top-flight football league, and the 82nd in which it was professional. Nacional was the defending champion.

Teams
Sixteen teams will compete in the Primera División this season. Thirteen teams remained from the 2011–12 season. Rentistas, Rampla Juniors, and Cerrito were relegated after accumulating the fewest points in the relegation table. They were replaced by Central Español, Juventud, and Progreso, the 2011–12 Segunda División winner, runner-up, and playoff winner, respectively. All of the new teams are making repeat appearances.

Managerial changes

Torneo Apertura

Standings

Results

Top goalscorers

Updated as of games played on  September 9, 2012.Source:

Torneo Clausura

Standings

Results

Aggregate table

Relegation

Championship playoff
Peñarol and Defensor Sporting qualified to the championship playoffs as the Apertura and Clausura winners, respectively. Additionally, Peñarol re-qualified as the team with the most points in the season aggregate table. Given this situation, an initial playoff was held between the two teams. Peñarol would become the season champion with a win; Defensor Sporting needed to win the playoff to force a two-legged final.

References

External links
Asociación Uruguaya de Fútbol 
Tournament regulations 

2012-13
1
2013 in South American football leagues
2012 in South American football leagues